Charles Fernley Fawcett (2 December 1915 – 3 February 2008) was an American adventurer, soldier, film actor, and a co-founder of the International Medical Corps. He was a recipient of the French Croix de Guerre and the American Eisenhower medal, and was declared Righteous Among the Nations for his assistance in rescuing and safeguarding Jewish refugees during World War II. Varian Fry, his longtime associate, described him as "a moral adventurer."

Early life
Charles Fernley Fawcett was born in Waleska, Georgia, where his mother had been caught in a snow storm and died when he was six. His family was of old Virginian stock, whose family tree included Thomas Jefferson and James Madison. Having been orphaned at an early age, Fawcett and his younger brother and two sisters grew up in Greenville, South Carolina, in the care of their aunt. Here he attended Greenville High School for three years where he learned to wrestle and play American football.

At age 15, Fawcett became involved in an affair with his best friend's mother. He remarked, "If that's child molestation, I would wish this curse on every young boy." The end of the affair made Fawcett contemplate suicide, and he left the United States in 1932 at age 16 to travel to the Far East, working his passage on a number of steamships with the U.S. Merchant Marine.

By 1937, he had returned to America and stayed for a time in New York City before making his way to Washington D.C., where he was taken in by his cousin, who happened to be an assistant United States Postmaster General. Here he ended up wrestling to make a living. Then in 1937 he boarded a ship outside Montreal bound for France, where he worked as an artist’s model, a jazz musician, and later a professional wrestler.

World War II
After the outbreak of World War II in 1939, Fawcett joined the Polish Army but had been in barracks for only a week before escaping from the advancing Nazis and hitchhiking back to Paris. He tried to join both U.S. Intelligence and the French Armed Forces but his services were declined, so he briefly joined the Section Volontaire des Américains of the French ambulance corps in 1940. He was on his way to North Africa to join the French Resistance when he heard about Varian Fry, who would go on to rescue over 2,000 Jews from Vichy France with the help of a handful of people, Fawcett among them. Among the most famous people they rescued were Franz Werfel, Marc Chagall, Heinrich Mann and Hannah Arendt.

"I went to see him and he wasn’t very interested until I told him I’d been a professional wrestler. He said, ‘Maybe we could use you to sort of keep order. Anybody who’s not supposed to be there, you can get rid of them’," Fawcett recalled in an interview with Dr. Stephen D. Smith in 1998. "Fry was perhaps one of the most idealistic men I had ever known and certainly the most unassuming. We got rid in a hurry of his little bow-tie and striped suit. Out of place completely in Marseilles. Maybe one of the reasons he got away with a lot was because he looked so innocent."

In Paris, Fawcett took part in the rescue of a group of British prisoners of war who had been placed under French guard in a hospital ward by the Germans. By impersonating a German ambulance crew, Fawcett and a comrade marched in at 4am and ordered the French nurses to usher the POWs out into the yard. "Gentlemen," he announced as he drove them away, "consider yourself liberated". "You're a Yank," said a British voice. "Never," came Fawcett's lilting southern burr, "confuse a Virginian with a Yankee".

In 1942, he enlisted in the Royal Air Force and trained as a fighter pilot, flying the Hawker Hurricane but was invalided out that Christmas with tuberculosis, from which he had suffered as a youth. After convalescing in a Canadian sanatorium, Fawcett made his way back to the United States in 1943. From New York, he traveled to a TB clinic in Arizona where he remained for about a year. In 1944, he returned to Italy and rejoined the American Ambulance Corps.

Towards the end of the war, Fawcett posed as the husband of six Jewish women in three months. This enabled the women, who had formerly been imprisoned in Nazi concentration camps, to leave France with an American visa. Eventually, he had to flee France at several hours' notice after a tip-off that the Gestapo was coming to arrest him.

Having left France, he joined up with the French Foreign Legion in 1945, fighting for six months in the forests of Alsace, and took part in the liberation of Colmar. A further bout of tuberculosis landed him in the Legionnaires' Hospital in Paris.

He was a recipient of the French Croix de Guerre and the American Eisenhower medal. His unlikely, some would say unbelievable, life was informed by an impulse to stand up for the underdog mixed with a thirst for glamour and adventure. Fawcett charmed everyone he met with tales of swashbuckling intrigue and good deeds.

Post-war
By 1948, Fawcett was back in action serving in the Greek Army against the Communists during the Greek Civil War, fighting in a lounge suit in the guise of a journalist, since no foreigners were permitted to be involved.

In 1949, Fawcett pursued a cinematic career, in which he performed in over 100 films, working with such stars as Errol Flynn, Alan Ladd and Robert Taylor. He combined this with smuggling refugees to safety from civil conflict, organizing earthquake relief teams, fighting in several wars and co-founding the International Medical Corps.

In 1956, Fawcett helped to rescue refugees from the Hungarian Uprising. Then he spent three years in the Belgian Congo, during the civil war in the early 60s, where he flew out those who were unable to escape the fighting. But it was the Soviet invasion of Afghanistan, in June 1979, that signaled his longest mission, and he was off to help the Afghan resistance fighters for the next 12 years.

In 2006, Fawcett was nominated for recognition as Righteous Among the Nations at the annual British Holocaust commemoration.

Acting career 
Fawcett appeared in some 100 film, television and radio productions between 1949 and 1976. He initially worked in France, but after 1952 worked primarily in Italy, having moved to Rome with his wife that year. During this time, he purportedly engaged in an affair with actress Hedy Lamarr.

Personal life 
Fawcett's first wife, with whom he had a daughter, died in 1956. In 1991, he married again, when after a 30-year engagement he married April Ducksbury, a British model agency executive, and settled in London.

Death 
Fawcett died on 3 February 2008 in London at the age of 92.

Selected filmography

 Hans le marin (1949)
 Le grand rendez-vous (1950) - L'ambassadeur
 Casimir (1950) - Mr. Brown, le PDG de Prima
 Lost Souvenirs (1950) - L'Américain (segment "Une statuette d'Osiris") (uncredited)
 L'inconnue de Montréal (1950)
 Adventures of Captain Fabian (1951) - Defense Counsel
 Fugitive in Trieste (1951)
 Ils étaient cinq (1951)
 Ha da venì... don Calogero (1952) - Don Andrea
 When in Rome (1952) - Mr. Cates
 La Putain respectueuse (1952) - (uncredited)
 Three Forbidden Stories (1952) - Mottaroni (Second segment)
 I sette dell'Orsa maggiore (1953)
 The Unfaithfuls (1953) - Harry Rodgers
 The Blind Woman of Sorrento (1953) - Marchese di Rionero
 Terminal Station (1953) - Il signore triste all'ufficio postale (uncredited)
 Egypt by Three (1953) - American Doctor (second episode)
 The Enchanting Enemy (1953) - (uncredited)
 At the Edge of the City (1953) 
 Fermi tutti... arrivo io! (1953) - Mr. Brown
 Frine, Courtesan of Orient (1953) - re Arconte
 Mizar (1954) - maggiore Crob
 The Country of the Campanelli (1954) - L'ammiraglio
 Pietà per chi cade (1954) - Oliver
 Appassionatamente (1954) - Count D'Alberti
 The Two Orphans (1954)
 An American in Rome (1954) - Mr. Brooks
 Goodbye Naples (1955) - Charles Burton
 Il falco d'oro (1955) - Ubaldo della Torre
 Andrea Chenier (1955)
 Incatenata dal destino (1956) - John Carrington
 Mai ti scorderò (1956) - Neri, il regista
 War and Peace (1956) - Russian artillery captain (uncredited)
 I Vampiri (1957) - Signor Robert
 Boy on a Dolphin (1957) - Bill B. Baldwin (uncredited)
 The Love Specialist (1957)
 The Violet Seller (1958) - Van de Ritzen
 The Last Rebel (1958) - Captain Harry Love
 Lonelyhearts (1958) - Smitty
 Civitas De (1958)
 No Time to Kill (1959) - Marine
 Face of Fire (1959) - Citizen in Barbershop
 La duchessa di Santa Lucia (1959) - Il padre di Archibald
 Les canailles (1960)
 The Loves of Salammbo (1960) - Annone
 Heaven on Earth (1960) - Henry Brent
 Come September (1961) - Warren (uncredited)
 Barabbas (1961) - Old Man Warning Rachel (uncredited)
 The Witch's Curse (1962) - Doctor
 It Happened in Athens (1962) - Ambassador Cyrus T. Gaylord
 The 300 Spartans (1962) - Megistias
 Zorro and the Three Musketeers (1963)
 I Am Semiramis (1963)
 Captain Sindbad (1963)
 Dark Purpose (1964) - Martin
 The Secret of Dr. Mabuse (1964) - Cmdr. Adams
 Panic Button (1964)
 Old Shatterhand (1964) - General Taylor
 Uncle Tom's Cabin (1965) - Mr. Shelby
 Wild Kurdistan (1965) - Scheik Mohammed Emin / Scheik Kadir Bei
 Kingdom of the Silver Lion (1965) - Scheik Kadir Bei
 Savage Pampas (1966) - Pvt. El Gato
 Spy Today, Die Tomorrow (1967) - General Stikker
 Feuer frei auf Frankie (1967) - Prof. Peers
 Caccia ai violenti (1968)
 The Girl of the Nile (1969) - Marco Alfieri
 The Massacre of Glencoe (1971) - John Macdonald
 Kalimán, el hombre increíble (1972) - Professor Morgan
 Down the Ancient Staircase (1975) - Doctor Sfameni
 Blue Belle'' (1976) - Michael / Annie's lover (final film role)

References

External links 
 
 Profile at Varian Fry Institute
 USC Shoah Foundation interview

1915 births
2008 deaths
20th-century American male actors
American expatriates in Poland
American expatriates in France
American expatriates in Italy
American expatriates in the United Kingdom
American filmmakers
American anti-communists
American anti-fascists
American male film actors
American male television actors
American Righteous Among the Nations
Greenville Senior High School (Greenville, South Carolina) alumni
Recipients of the Croix de Guerre 1939–1945 (France)
Soldiers of the French Foreign Legion
Sportspeople from Greenville, South Carolina
United States Merchant Mariners
Polish military personnel of World War II
Royal Air Force personnel of World War II
Free French military personnel of World War II
Greek Civil War
Soviet–Afghan War
People who rescued Jews during the Holocaust
20th-century American actors